Deodatus (Dié, Didier, Dieudonné, Déodat, Adéodat) of Nevers (d. June 19, ca. 679 AD) was a bishop of Nevers from 655.  Deodatus lived with Arbogast in the monastery of Ebersheim, established by Childeric II near Sélestat in the forest of Haguenau.

Exploits

Deodatus' establishment of the monastery Juncturae (Jointures) in the present town of Saint-Dié followed his appointment as the bishop of Nevers.  He placed Jointures under the Rule of Saint Columban (later changed to that of Saint Benedict).

He baptized the son of Saint Hunna (Una), who was also named Deodatus and who is also venerated as a saint.  Hunna's son became a monk at Ebersheim. 

After 664 Deodatus renounced his see to withdraw to the so-called valley of "Galilaea" in the Vosges, where he lived as a hermit in a cell.

Tradition states that he died in the arms of Saint Hidulphus, bishop of Treves.

Veneration
The town of Saint-Dié grew up around the monastery of Jointures.  However, some sources connect the name with an earlier saint, Deodatus of Blois (d. 525).

References

External links
 
 Deodatus (Dieudonné, Dié) von St. Dié
 Den hellige Deodatus av Nevers

7th-century Frankish bishops
Bishops of Nevers
French hermits
679 deaths
7th-century Frankish saints
Year of birth unknown